The Pac-12 Defensive Player of the Year is an annual college basketball award presented to the top defensive player in men's basketball in the Pac-12 Conference. The winner is selected by conference coaches, who are not allowed to vote for players on their own team. The award began in 1984, when the conference consisted of 10 teams and was known as the Pacific-10. It stopped being issued starting in 1988 but was restarted in 2008. The conference added two teams and became the Pac-12 in 2011.

Jorge Gutiérrez of California (2012) and Evan Mobley of USC (2021) are the only players to also win the Pac-12 Player of the Year in the same season. Gary Payton won both awards in separate seasons with Oregon State, capturing the defensive honor as a freshman in 1987 and the conference player of the year as a senior in 1990.  He credited Beavers coach Ralph Miller with molding him into a standout defender. Payton played 17 seasons in the National Basketball Association (NBA), and became the only point guard to be named the NBA Defensive Player of the Year. His son, Gary Payton II, later played with Oregon State as well, and was voted the Pac-12 Defensive Player of the Year in 2015 and 2016. He and Matisse Thybulle (2018, 2019) are the only repeat winners of the award.

Winners

Winners by school

References

Awards established in 1984
College basketball conference trophies and awards in the United States
Defensive Player of the Year